Red Blades of Black Cathay is a collection of Fantasy short stories by Robert E. Howard and Tevis Clyde Smith.  It was first published in 1971 by Donald M. Grant, Publisher, Inc. in an edition of 1,091 copies.  The title story originally appeared in the magazine Oriental Stories.

Contents
 Introduction, by Tevis Clyde Smith
 "Red Blades of Black Cathay"
 "Diogenes of Today"
 "Eighttoes Makes a Play"

References

1971 short story collections
Short story collections by Robert E. Howard
Donald M. Grant, Publisher books
Fantasy short story collections